is a railway station in the town of Mitane, Yamamoto District, Akita Prefecture, Japan, operated by East Japan Railway Company (JR East).

Lines
Moritake Station is served by the Ōu Main Line, and is located 345.1 km from the terminus of the line at Fukushima Station.

Station layout
Moritake Station consists of two opposed side platforms connected by a footbridge. The station is attended.

Platforms

History
Moritake Station opened on August 1, 1902 as a station on the Japanese Government Railways (JGR), serving the village of Moritake, Akita. The JGR became the Japanese National Railways (JNR) after World War II. The station was absorbed into the JR East network upon the privatization of the JNR on April 1, 1987.

Passenger statistics
In fiscal 2018, the station was used by an average of 181 passengers daily (boarding passengers only). The passenger figures for previous years are as shown below.

Surrounding area
 Moritake Post Office
 Moritake Onsen

See also
 List of railway stations in Japan

References

External links

  

Railway stations in Japan opened in 1902
Railway stations in Akita Prefecture
Ōu Main Line
Mitane, Akita